Mycetoglyphus is a genus of mites in the family Acaridae.

Species
 Mycetoglyphus fungivorus Oudemans, 1932
 Mycetoglyphus sevastianovi Kadzhaja, 1988

References

Acaridae